Court Theatre (German: Burgtheater) is a 1936 Austrian drama film directed by Willi Forst and starring Werner Krauss,  Carl Esmond and Hortense Raky.

Much of the film was shot on location in the Burgtheater in Vienna. The Sievering Studios were also used for the production. The film's sets were designed by the art directors Kurt Herlth, Werner Schlichting and Emil Stepanek.

Main cast
 Werner Krauss as Friedrich Mitterer
 Carl Esmond as Josef Rainer 
 Hortense Raky as Leni Schindler
 Olga Chekhova as Baroness Seebach
 Hans Moser as Souffleur Sedlmayer
 Karl Günther as Baron Seebach 
 Karl Skraup as Schindler
 Josefine Dora as Frau Schindler
 Franz Herterich as Direktor des Burgtheaters
 Erik Frey as Schauspieler des Burgtheaters
 O. W. Fischer as Schauspieler des Burgtheaters
 Maria Holst as Fritzi
 Camilla Gerzhofer as Frau von S. Gesellschaftsdame  
 Karl Paryla as Erster junger Schauspieler  
 Fred Steinbacher as Zweiter junger Schauspieler 
 Marietta Weber as Erste Schauspielerin  
 Kurt von Lessen as Der Kritiker  
 Georg Schmieter as Opernsänger  
 Babette Devrient as Fürstin  
 Rudolf Teubler as Majordomus  
 Irma Eckert as Zofe  
 Otto Hartmann as Vorsprechender Schauspieler  
 Maria Lehdin as Gretchen  
 Marie Hilde as Lintschi  
 August Keilholz as Diener
 Ady Berber as Heurigensänger

References

Bibliography
 Robert Dassanowsky. Austrian Cinema: A History. McFarland, 2005.

External links 

1936 films
1930s German-language films
Films about actors
Films set in the 1900s
Films set in Vienna
Films directed by Willi Forst
1930s historical drama films
Austrian historical drama films
Films shot at Sievering Studios
Austrian black-and-white films
1936 drama films